second place is a term in rankings

Second place in Hare coursing
Second Place", single by Buccaneer (musician) 1996 
Second Place", single by Royce da 5'9" from Success Is Certain 2011
Second Place (novel), a 2021 novel by English writer Rachel Cusk